Tarumanagara University (Indonesian: Universitas Tarumanagara (UNTAR)) is a university in Jakarta, Indonesia and one of the oldest private universities in the country. In 2017 UNTAR received an accreditation A (meaning Excellent) from the Government's National Accreditation Board (BAN-PT). It has 4 campuses, where Campus I (main campus) and Campus II are located in the metropolitan area of West Jakarta, and Campus III in South Jakarta. A future Campus IV of 130 hectares, currently under construction, is in Karawaci (a satellite town some 25 kilometers from West Jakarta), and will become an integrated campus called Tarumanagara City. Currently UNTAR is led by Rector Prof. Dr. Ir. Agustinus Purna Irawan, and Vice-Rector Dr. R.M. Gatot P. Soemartono.

Academics
There are eight faculties and a post-graduate program in the university as follows:
 Faculty of Economy and Business
 Faculty of Law
 Faculty of Engineering
 Faculty of Medicine
 Faculty of Psychology
 Faculty of Arts and Design
 Faculty of Information Technology
 Faculty of Communications Science
 Graduate Business School

The university offers Bachelor's and master's degree programs, as well as Doctoral degrees by research.

Notable alumni

 Djan Faridz
 Mona Ratuliu
 Erzaldi Rosman Djohan

External links

Universities in Indonesia
Universities in Jakarta
Private universities and colleges in Jakarta
West Jakarta